Marlin B. Nelsen Jr. (September 18, 1936 – December 6, 1980) was an American politician and chiropractor.

Nelsen was born in North Dakota and graduated from Northfield High School in Northfield, Minnesota. Nelsen lived in Aitkin, Minnesota with his wife and family and was a chiropractor. He served in the Minnesota House of Representatives from 1977 until his death in 1980. Nelsen was a Democrat. Nelsen died from a stroke while elk hunting in the Gallatin Mountain Range in Montana.

References

1936 births
1980 deaths
People from Aitkin, Minnesota
People from North Dakota
American chiropractors
Democratic Party members of the Minnesota House of Representatives